Eugenia valsuganana is a species of plant in the family Myrtaceae. It is endemic to the municipality of Santa Teresa, Espírito Santo, Brazil and was first described in 2010. The tree grows to between 4 and 7 metres tall, and produces edible yellow fruit that are 16–20 mm in diameter.

References

valsuganana
Crops originating from the Americas
Crops originating from Brazil
Tropical fruit
Endemic flora of Brazil
Fruits originating in South America
Fruit trees
Berries
Plants described in 2010